Wads Creek is a  long 3rd order tributary to the Little River in Moore County, North Carolina.

Course
Wads Creek rises on the McLendon Creek divide in a pond at Pleasantville in Moore County, North Carolina.  Wads Creek then flows southeasterly to meet the Little River about 1.5 miles west-northwest of Whispering Pines.

Watershed
Wads Creek drains  of area, receives about 49.1 in/year of precipitation, has a topographic wetness index of 432.61 and is about 57% forested.

External links
Article from Sandhills Magazine

References

Rivers of North Carolina
Rivers of Moore County, North Carolina